Ecuadorian Sign Language is the deaf sign language of Ecuador.

Classification
Clark notes that Peruvian, Bolivian, Ecuadorian and Colombian sign languages "have significant lexical similarities to each other" and "contain a certain degree of lexical influence from ASL" as well, at least going by the forms in national dictionaries. Chilean and Argentinian share these traits, though to a lesser extent.

References

Sign language isolates
Languages of Ecuador